Zhao Wenfu (1913–1990) was a People's Republic of China politician. He was born in Xin'an County, Luoyang, Henan Province. He was the 3rd Chairman of the People's Standing Congress of Henan. He was a delegate to the 1st National People's Congress, 2nd National People's Congress, 3rd National People's Congress, 5th National People's Congress, 6th National People's Congress and 7th National People's Congress.

1913 births
1990 deaths
People's Republic of China politicians from Henan
Chinese Communist Party politicians from Henan
Political office-holders in Henan
Politicians from Luoyang
Delegates to the 1st National People's Congress
Delegates to the 2nd National People's Congress
Delegates to the 3rd National People's Congress
Delegates to the 5th National People's Congress
Delegates to the 6th National People's Congress
Delegates to the 7th National People's Congress
CPPCC Chairmen of Henan
Vice-governors of Henan